Lederman or Ledermann is a surname. Notable people with the surname include:

 D. Ross Lederman (1894-1972), American B-film director
Dr. Gilbert "Gil" Lederman, physician, talk radio host, and proponent of radiosurgery, notoriously sued by the estate of George Harrison (for breaching Harrison's privacy and for forcing Harrison to sign a guitar)
 Harold Lederman (1940–2019), American boxing judge and analyst
 Barbara Ledermann (born 1925), Holocaust survivor
 Jean-Marc Lederman, Belgian music composer
 Leon Lederman (born 1947), Israeli chess master
 Leon M. Lederman (1922-2018), Nobel laureate in physics
 Marty Lederman, Visiting Professor of Law at the Georgetown University Law Center
 Robert Lederman, television director, e.g., of Star Trek: Voyager (1995)
 Sanne Ledermann (1928–1943), victim of the Holocaust
 Susan Lederman, Canadian experimental psychologist
 Walter Ledermann (1911-2009), mathematician
 William Lederman (1916-1992), Canadian constitutional scholar and the first dean of Queen's University Faculty of Law

Jewish surnames
Germanic-language surnames
Occupational surnames

fr:Lederman